Austurstræti ('East Street') is a street in central Reykjavík, Iceland, that runs from Veltusund east to Lækjargata. In its continuation is Bankastræti and Laugavegur. On 18 April 2007, a fire broke out in Austurstræti that destroyed two historic houses, but caused no injuries.

Names 
The street was so named because its south side was paved with stone so people could walk over it despite heavy rain.

In popular culture 
 Comedian Laddi sang about Austurstræti in a popular pop song with the same name. Its opening lines are: 
 The pop song "Fröken Reykjavík" by Jónas and Jón Múla Árnason begins with the question: 
 Poet Tómas Guðmundsson wrote the poem "", which includes the lines:

References 

Shopping districts and streets in Iceland
Streets in Reykjavík
Tourist attractions in Iceland